The 2011 America East men's lacrosse tournament was the 12th edition of the America East Conference men's lacrosse tournament and took place from May 4 to May 7 at the higher seeds home field. The winner of the tournament received the America East Conference's automatic bid to the 2011 NCAA Division I Men's Lacrosse Championship. Four teams from the America East conference will compete in the single elimination tournament. The seeds were based upon the teams' regular season conference record.

Standings

Only the top four teams in the America East conference advanced to the America East Conference Tournament.

Schedule

Bracket

 denotes an overtime game

All-Tournament
Scott Bement, Hartford (GK)

Conor Flynn, Hartford

Rob Camposa, Stony Brook (GK)

Kyle Moeller, Stony Brook

Jeff Donigan, Binghamton

Tyler Perrelle, Binghamton

Rob Grimm, UMBC

David Stock, UMBC

Most Outstanding Player

Scott Bement, Hartford (GK)

References 

http://www.americaeast.com/ViewArticle.dbml?DB_OEM_ID=14000&ATCLID=205148302 Retrieved 2015-05-10

http://www.americaeast.com/SportSelect.dbml?SPSID=65879&SPID=6539&DB_OEM_ID=14000&Q_SEASON=2010 Retrieved 2015-05-10

External links

2011 in lacrosse